South Bald Mountain is the highest summit of the Laramie Mountains in the Rocky Mountains of North America.  The summit in Roosevelt National Forest southwest of Red Feather Lakes is the highest of five peaks forming Bald Mountain.

Historical names
Bald Mountain
South Bald Mountain

See also

List of Colorado mountain ranges
List of Colorado mountain summits
List of Colorado fourteeners
List of Colorado 4000 meter prominent summits
List of the most prominent summits of Colorado
List of Colorado county high points

References

External links

Mountains of Colorado
Mountains of Larimer County, Colorado
North American 3000 m summits